Sans or SANS may refer to:

San people, an indigenous people of Southern Africa
Daniel Sans (born 1975), German tenor
Matthieu Sans (born 1988), French footballer
Sans, a 2018 album by Keller Williams
Şans, a 2009 album by Murat Boz
Sans (Undertale), a video game character
 "sans.", a 2015 song by Toby Fox from Undertale Soundtrack
Sans-serif, or sans, a typeface feature

Acronyms
SANS device (Stoller Afferent Nerve Stimulator), a medical instrument
SANS Institute (SysAdmin, Audit, Network and Security), an American internet security training company
Sag Harbor Hills, Azurest, and Ninevah Beach Subdivisions Historic District, in Sag Harbor, New York, US
Small-angle neutron scattering, a method of studying polymers and colloids

See also
 
 SAN (disambiguation)
 Sans Souci (disambiguation)